Kosaki overgrowth syndrome is a rare syndrome caused by mutations in the PDGFRB gene.

Presentation

The features of this syndrome affect the face, skin, brain and the body.

Face:
 downslanting palpebral fissures
 pointed chin
 prominent forehead
 proptosis
 thin upper lip
 wide nasal bridge

Skin:
 fragile
 hyperelastic

Brain:
 Low IQ
 Periventricular white matter lesions

Body:

The height, lower-segment, hand, and foot length are all greater than usual.

Genetics

No inheritance pattern has been described as these mutations appear to have arisen de novo. This syndrome is due to mutations in a single copy of the PDGFRB gene.

Treatment

History

This condition was first described in Japan in 2011 by Watanabe et al. These authors thought the condition was the Shprintzen-Goldberg syndrome but the patient lacked a mutation in the SKI gene. A second case was described by Takenouchi et al in 2015. These authors recognised that this condition was novel and on performing a whole genome sequencing found mutations in the PDGFRB gene. A further 24 cases were reported in 2017 by Gawliński et al.

References

External links 

Genetic diseases and disorders
Rare diseases